A petty sessional division was, in England and Wales, the area that a magistrates' court had jurisdiction over (before the abolition of quarter sessions, specifically the petty sessions).  Petty sessional divisions were gradually consolidated in the 20th century (being reorganised in 1953 under the Justices of the Peace Act 1949), and were replaced by local justice areas in 2005.

Petty sessional divisions were formalised under the Division of Counties Act 1828 (9 Geo. IV c.43), but they had existed informally for centuries as arrangements within the counties themselves.

The areas were restated by the Local Government (Petty Sessional Divisions etc.) Order 1973 (SI 1973/1593).

Former courts and tribunals in England and Wales
Administrative divisions of England
Administrative divisions of Wales
1828 establishments in England
1828 establishments in Wales
2005 disestablishments in England
2000s disestablishments in Wales